The World History Association (WHA) is an academic association that promotes the study of world history through the encouragement of research, teaching, and publication. It was founded in 1982.

The WHA provides many opportunities for connecting world historians with one another. It publishes the Journal of World History and World History Bulletin, and has awarded World History Association Book Prize since 1999.

Affiliates 
California World History Association (CWHA)
Mid-Atlantic World History Association (MAWHA)
Midwest World History Association (MWWHA). It was founded in 2009 and officially recognized as an affiliate of the WHA on January 8, 2010.  It represents world historians in all thirteen Midwestern states: Illinois, Indiana, Iowa, Kansas, Michigan, Minnesota, Missouri, Nebraska, North Dakota, Oklahoma, Ohio, South Dakota, and Wisconsin. Its peer-reviewed journal, The Middle Ground Journal, publishes articles and essays as well as nonfiction, fiction, film, and television reviews. It also publishes reviews of textbooks and reflective presentations of teaching materials.  The journal is housed at the College of St. Scholastica in Duluth, Minnesota, and the chief editor is Professor Hong-Ming Liang.
Mountain West World History Association
New England Regional World History Association (NERWHA)
Northwest World History Association (NWWHA)
Southeast World History Association (SEWHA)
World History Association of Hawai’i (WHAH)
World History Association of Texas (WHAT)
ANGH/RAHM – African Network in Global History / Réseau Africain d’Histoire Mondiale
Asian Association of World Historians
Europe World History Association

References

External links
 
 Middle Ground Journal
 Midwest World History Association

History organizations based in the United States
Organizations established in 1982
World history
1982 establishments in the United States
Member organizations of the American Council of Learned Societies